Misty Jean (born c. 1980 in Haiti) is a former Miss West Indies and singer. She sings in her native Haitian Creole / French language and also in English.

Biography 
Misty Jean started performing at age of three with the dance institute of Lynn W. Rouzier. She started singing at the age of seven in amateur singing contests. Since then, her passion for music became an obsession. At the college of "Anglade" where she graduated, she was named soloist of the choir and became an instant neighborhood celebrity.

In 1998, she took part in La Soiree Magique De La Guitare with well-known pianist Raoul Denis Jr. and The Widmaier brothers.
In 1999, she is chosen by Haitel the leading Haitian cellular phone company to be their spokesmodel in a major promotional campaign. 
 
During the month of February 2001, she flew to the island of Saint Maarten where she represented Haiti among twenty two other countries for the title of Miss West Indies. On February 21, she won the contest for best talent and was crowned Miss West Indies.

On May 27, 2001, she sang at the Ritz Kinam in Pétion-Ville, Haiti, on the night entitled "Femme" of Yole Derose. She may also be found in Caribbean Escape of Raoul Denis Jr.

In February 2002, she was crowned Miss de la Francophonie in Port-au-Prince, Haiti.

In March 2003, she performed at Diva's Night at Gusto's in Miami Lakes, Florida.
On April 13, 2003, she was crowned Queen of Carnival at the Greater Miami Mardi Gras.
 
Her First French / Creole album entitled Plus Pres De Toi was released in June 2004. It included hits like "Patizan", "Ce Ou Mwen Vle", "Maladie D'amour" and many more.

On the Fourth of July 2004, she performed live at the Bayfront Park alongside Lil' Kim.
In August 2004, she embarked on a tour of the French Antilles where she performed remarkably for many audiences.
In December 2005, she performed at Bataclan located in Paris, France.  In February 2006, she performed at Bicentennial Park for the Greater Miami Mardi Gras, in Florida.
 
Her second album entitled Konpa A Gogo came out in May 2006. It contains the hit songs: "Konpa A Gogo" Featuring Kaysha, "Car Wash", "Paradi Lanmou", "S’abandonner" a Duet with Thierry Cham, "Hear the Tam Tam", and "Camionette".

In December 2006, she released her first live album with her band composed of very young talented musicians.

In January 2007, she hosted the Haitian Independence Festival at Bayfront Park.
 
Her third solo album Li Pa Two Ta released in April 2008 contained the following hits: "Kijan Lari A Ye", "Rev Mwen", "Tu pleures", "Vini’m Bo’w", "Li Pa Two Ta", "Lanmou Tounen Prizon", "Vale Fan’m", "Hommage A Ti Manno", "Tam Tam" featuring Puerto Rican rapper Shino. Several talented producers, musicians and artists participated in this project.

In February 2009, she performed with her band on the float of Unitransfer at the Jacmel Carnival in Haiti. During the same period, she performed at the Concert Chocolat at the prestigious Parc Historique de la Canne in Port-au-Prince.

On June 25, 2009, she made her acting debut in the movie The Price to Pay by Mora Etienne Jr. in which she played the lead role of "Zoulmie".

In December 2009, she released her second live album.
 
She has released five videos that get airplayed regularly: "Kijan La Ri A Ye", "Tam Tam featuring Shino", "Paradi Lanmou", "Maladie D'Amour", and "Ce Ou Mwen Vle".

Her fourth solo album Just Like That will be released in February 2011. It contains the following songs: "Just Like That", "Nou Pa Ka Zanmi", "The Only One", "Nou Kwe" (Duet With Tanya St Val), "Sa Red", "Booty Call", "Gradiasyon", "Ton Absence" (Duet with Oswald), "Lumane Cazimir", "Peyizan", "Sispan'n Koupe", "Jwi La Vi", "A Gogo", "Tonton Nwel".

She is also currently working on her first all English album which will be released later in 2011.

Awards
She was awarded Female Singer of The Year by Ticket D’Or of Ticket Magazine in Haiti in 2004.

She was awarded Female Singer of the Year by Ticket D’Or in 2006.

She was awarded Best Female Artist by Opamizik in 2008.

References

External links 
 Official Website
  Official Myspace

21st-century Haitian women singers
People from Port-au-Prince
Living people
1980s births